Parliamentary elections were held in Hungary on 8 June 1985. The Patriotic People's Front, dominated by the Communist Hungarian Socialist Workers' Party, was the only organisation allowed to contest the election. All prospective candidates had to accept the Front's program in order to be eligible. 

The HSWP, the only legal political party in the country, won 288 of the 387 seats, with 98 of the remaining 99 going to independents selected by the party. The one other seat remained unfilled until the following year.

Electoral system
The elections took place under new rules enacted in 1983 that allowed for wider participation in the electoral process. In addition to the 352 single-member constituencies, a further 35 MPs were elected unopposed via a national list. According to Politburo member Mihaly Korom, this was necessary in order to ensure the "representation of leading personalities" whose activities extended "beyond the boundaries of their electoral districts." Voters who were away from home on election day could only vote on the national list, which had around 160,000 extra voters compared to the single-member constituencies.

There had to be at least two candidates in the single-member constituencies, which was achieved everywhere except Keszthely, where one candidate withdrew his nomination. A by-election was later held for the seat in the spring of 1986. In 54 constituencies, mainly in urban areas, at least three and as many as four candidates appeared on the ballot.

Results

References

Elections in Hungary
Parliamentary
Hungary
One-party elections
Hungary

hu:Országgyűlési választások a Magyar Népköztársaságban#1985